Vladimir Sergeyevich Belousov (born 11 July 1947) is a Russian professional football coach and former defender.

Career
In 1976 he became the champion of the USSR with a FC Torpedo Moscow.

References

External links
 

1947 births
Living people
Soviet footballers
Association football defenders
SC Tavriya Simferopol players
FC Shakhtar Donetsk players
FC Torpedo Moscow players
FC Kuban Krasnodar players
TSG Neustrelitz players
Russian football managers
Russian expatriate footballers
Russian expatriate sportspeople in Germany
Expatriate footballers in Germany
Footballers from Moscow